Sicario is a 1994 Venezuelan drama film directed by Joseph Novoa. The film was submitted as the Venezuelan entry for the Academy Award for Best Foreign Language Film. It also was a finalist at the Goya Award for Best Spanish Language Foreign Film 1995.

Plot
Jairo is a teenager living in a drugs- and violence-infested neighborhood who becomes a hired killer or sicario for a criminal gang.

Cast
 Laureano Olivares as Jairo
 Herman Gil as Aurelio
 Néstor Terán as Tigre
 Melissa Ponce as Rosa
 Gledys Ibarra as Carlota
 William Moreno as Aguirre

Production
The story takes place in Medellín, Colombia; it was filmed in Caracas, Venezuela.

See also
 List of submissions to the 68th Academy Awards for Best Foreign Language Film
 List of Venezuelan submissions for the Academy Award for Best Foreign Language Film

References

External links
 

1994 films
1994 drama films
1990s Spanish-language films
Venezuelan drama films